White mullein is a common name for several plants in the genus Verbascum and may refer to:

Verbascum blattaria, native to Europe, Asia, and North Africa
Verbascum lychnitis, native to Europe and Asia
Verbascum thapsus, native to Europe, Asia, and North Africa